Muhammad Zahril Azri bin Zabri (born 4 February 1999) is a Malaysian footballer who play as a central midfielder for Malaysia Super League club Penang, on loan from Selangor.

International career

Youth

Zahril was part of the national team  for the 2017 AFF U-18 Youth Championship that will take place in Yangon, Myanmar. On 26 October 2017, he was selected to play in 2018 AFC U-19 Championship qualification in Paju, South Korea.

Zahril was named in the Malaysia under 19 squad for 2018 AFF U-19 Youth Championship in the Indonesia. He has played in the final against Myanmar which Malaysia win 4–3.

On 15 October 2018, he was named in the under-19 side for the 2018 AFC U-19 Championship.

Career statistics

Club

Honours

Club
 Felda United
 Malaysia Premier League : 2018

International
Malaysia U-19
 AFF U-19 Youth Championship: 2018, runner-up: 2017

References

External links
 

1999 births
Living people
People from Penang
Malaysian footballers
Felda United F.C. players
Sarawak United FC players
Malaysia Super League players
Malaysia Premier League players
Association football midfielders
Malaysia youth international footballers